This is a list of notable people who self-identify as being sexually fluid, homoflexible, or heteroflexible.

List

See also
Lists of bisexual people
List of pansexual people
 List of people on the asexual spectrum

References

External links
 Human rights and sexuality: sexual fluidity

Lists of LGBT-related people